The 1988 season was the 51st completed season of the USSR Football Championship: Top League. Spartak Moscow, the defending 11-times champions, placed fourth this season.

Teams

Promoted teams
 FC Chernomorets Odessa – champion (returning after a season)
 FC Lokomotiv Moscow – 2nd place (returning after seven seasons)

Location

Final standings

Promotion
 Pamir Dushanbe
 Rotor Volgograd

Results

Top scorers
16 goals
 Aleksandr Borodyuk (Dynamo Moscow)
 Yevhen Shakhov (Dnipro)

15 goals
 Mikhail Rusyayev (Lokomotiv Moscow)

12 goals
 Sergei Rodionov (Spartak Moscow)

11 goals
 Oleg Protasov (Dynamo Kyiv)

10 goals
 Mashalla Akhmedov (Neftchi)
 Ihor Petrov (Shakhtar)

9 goals
 Sergei Dmitriyev (Zenit)
 Vladimir Grechnev (Torpedo Moscow)
 Gija Guruli (Dinamo Tbilisi)
 Vladimir Liuty (Dnipro)
 Arminas Narbekovas (Žalgiris)
 Andrei Rudakov (Torpedo Moscow)

Clean sheets

14 matches
 Valeri Sarychev (Torpedo Moscow)

12 matches
 Valeriy Horodov (Dnipro Dnipropetrovsk)

11 matches
 Stanislav Cherchesov (Lokomotiv Moscow)
 Aleksandr Podshivalov (Ararat Yerevan)
 Viktor Chanov (Dynamo Kyiv)

10 matches
 Rinat Dasayev (Spartak Moscow)

9 matches
 Otar Gabelia (Dinamo Tbilisi)
 Andrei Satsunkevich (Dinamo Minsk)

7 matches
 Mikhail Biryukov (Zenit Leningrad)

Medal squads
(league appearances and goals listed in brackets)

Number of teams by union republic

See also
 1988 Soviet First League
 1988 Soviet Second League

References

External links
 1988 season at RSSSF

Soviet Top League seasons
1
Soviet
Soviet